

Nakia Bahadir

Nakia Bahadir is a fictional character appearing in American comic books published by Marvel Comics. She is a Turkish girl and friend of Kamala Khan.

Nakia Bahadir in other media
Nakia Bahadir appears in Ms. Marvel, portrayed by Yasmeen Fletcher.

Bakuto

Bakuto is a fictional ninja in Marvel Comics. The character, created by Andy Diggle, Antony Johnston and Marco Checchetto, first appeared in Daredevil #505 (April 2010).

Bakuto, the head Daimyo of South America, meets with the other four Daimyos in Jigoku-Chu Castle in Japan. He shows some doubt in Matt Murdock leading The Hand and especially scoffs at White Tiger's involvement due to her being a woman. Beforehand, Bakuto killed his master, Izanagi, to showcase "[his] strength of will", even going so far as to not allowing him seppuku.

In the present, while having dinner, Bakuto's food is spiked causing him to hallucinate demons. Matt goes to check on him as Daredevil and are both immediately attacked by ninjas that were secretly sent by the other Daimyos. After defeating them, Matt is led to believe that someone is attempting to take Bakuto's life and ups the security. Despite this Bakuto believes that Matt was the one who sent the ninjas and begins plotting to kill him. He is later confronted by a possessed White Tiger and killed in sword combat.

Bakuto in other media
 Bakuto appeared in the Marvel Cinematic Universe series Iron Fist, portrayed by Ramón Rodríguez. Bakuto is one of the leaders of The Hand and is Colleen Wing's sensei from before the events of the series. Bakuto at first appears to be a benevolent person, aiding Danny Rand in his abilities and showing him footage of the previous Iron Fist, but soon it becomes apparent that he wishes to use Danny for his own purposes and especially has plans for the Meachums. After shooting Joy Meachum, he and his men take Danny, but end up fighting him along with Colleen and Davos. Bakuto battles Colleen with swords, but he is stabbed by his former pupil. Colleen refuses to kill Bakuto, so Davos does it for her. His body then disappears. Colleen assumes that Bakuto's people took it, but Danny recalls that Harold Meachum managed to come back from the dead.
 Bakuto reappeared in The Defenders, revived to full health. He is established to be one of the five Fingers of the Hand, the others being Sowande, Madame Gao, Alexandra, and Murakami. He first appears when he accosts Colleen, Danny and Luke as they are escorting Claire to the 29th Precinct for protective custody, but escapes. He is later present, along with Murakami and Madame Gao, when Elektra kills Alexandra and assumes command of the Hand. The three Fingers express disdain with Elektra for her actions, but she is undeterred, only interested in cultivating the substance so she can have eternal immortality. Nonetheless, the Fingers accost Matt, Luke and Jessica when they break out of the precinct and return to Midland Circle seeking to rescue Danny from Elektra. Bakuto comes very close to finishing off Matt until Colleen shows up to fight him off. Bakuto remains upstairs to fight Colleen, Claire and Misty. Regaining the upper hand, Colleen kills Bakuto, but not before he manages to cut off part of Misty's right arm.

Balthazar
Balthazar or Belathauzer in his first appearance, is a demon who has clashed with the Defenders and Devil-Slayer.

Martine Bancroft
Martine Bancroft is a fictional character appearing in American comic books published by Marvel Comics. Created by Roy Thomas and Gil Kane, she first appeared in The Amazing Spider-Man #102 (November 1971). She is the fiancée of Morbius, the Living Vampire.

Bancroft works as an assistant to Michael Morbius, whose experiments aim to cure his blood disease. They backfire and turn him into a vampire-esque individual. After being manipulated by a cult, Bancroft personally assists in finding resources to cure Morbius's "pseudo-vampirism". She is interrupted and ultimately turned into a similar creature before Morbius and Simon Stroud inject her with the cure. After being killed by David Langford, she is resurrected but gets possessed by the Lilin Parasite of Lilith's group before being saved by Morbius. Bancroft's original personality returns albeit with a vampire-esque form, and even has a friendship with Jack Russell / Werewolf. She ultimately acts spiteful towards her ex-fiance. After turning herself into a true vampire, Bancroft is killed by Morbius while saving Peter Parker / Spider-Man.

Martine Bancroft in other media
Martine Bancroft appears in the live-action Sony's Spider-Man Universe film Morbius (2022), portrayed by Adria Arjona. This version is a scientific colleague of Michael Morbius. She personally assists in the experiment that creates his vampiric form and is later killed by Morbius' adoptive brother Milo. Bancroft is later revived as a similar vampiric creature.

Bruce Banner

Rebecca Banner

Brian Banner

Bantam
Bantam is a fictional mutant. Created by Jim Lee and John Byrne, the character first appeared in The Uncanny X-Men #282.

Bantam is an assistant of Trevor Fitzroy who uses his power as a chronal anchor to keep track of his master's time portals. When Fitzroy takes over a future timeline and renames himself the Chronomancer, Bantam accompanies him. Bantam realizes that Fitzroy had been driven mad by his dreams of power, and eventually betrays his master to the rebellion led by Bishop. Bantam assists in the raising of the gate to the Chronomancer's keep, and dies at the hands of Fitzroy's Chronotroopers.

Bantam kept track of all of Fitzroy's time portals still in stasis. He was sensitive to the bioenergy emissions of other superhumans, allowing him to locate the site where the energy was released.

In other media 
Bantam appears in the two-part X-Men: The Animated Series episode "One Man's Worth".

Barbarus

Eli Bard
Eli Bard aka Eliphas is a fictional character appearing in American comic books published by Marvel Comics. Created by Christopher Yost, Clayton Crain and Craig Kyle, Bard is a member of the Purifiers and an enemy of the X-Men.

Eli Bard was born "Eliphas" at the height of the Roman Empire. He was recognized as an outstanding soldier until a spear injury ended his military career. For a while he worked unsuccessfully as a poet until he met Aurelia, one of the most powerful women in Rome. He soon married her and achieved a position in the Senate. As a well-respected senator, he was known as a great orator and a friend to the army. His wife left him for a general named Mascius and conspired to give Mascius his seat in the Senate.

Left with nothing, Eliphas was approached by Selene, who offered him immortality in exchange for helping her kill and absorb every soul in Rome. Eliphas drew pentagrams and performed rituals at several locations in the city, but warned a small girl to get her family out. The girl's father alerted the authorities and Eliphas and Selene were captured before the spell could be carried out. Just before they were burned at the stake, Selene killed the guards. She cursed Eliphas for his perceived betrayal with an eternal life of torture, turning him into a vampire-like creature. Eliphas was buried alive for 700 years until a farmer discovered him in his field. Eliphas killed the farmer with a swift bite to the jugular. He spent the next several hundred years searching for Selene. He ran into the ancestral Apache tribe of Warpath. They recognized him as a vampire but could not stop him from wiping out almost the entire tribe.

Eliphas, having at some point in time changed his name to "Eli Bard," finally located Selene in Nova Roma, where she was worshiped as a god. Still in love with her despite her curse, Bard realized that he must make an offering to her before approaching her. Bard later joined the Purifiers, an anti-mutant terrorist group. During this time, he worked diligently to further the Purifiers' goals. Secretly, however, he had hoped to sacrifice thousands of Purifiers' souls using the same ritual from Rome to gain Selene's attention. He assisted in the resurrection of Bastion but the android was suspicious of him, as he had no record on him. After seeing Bastion reprogram an offspring of Magus, he changed his plan and instead re-animated the corpses in the burial grounds of the Apache tribe that he had decimated decades earlier using the Technarch transmode virus he had absorbed from an offspring of Magus. Among the bodies reanimated were those of the mutants Caliban and Thunderbird. He presented Caliban to Selene and stated that he intended to use Caliban's mutant tracking abilities to track down deceased mutants and reanimate them to form an army for Selene, an offer which she accepted.

He uses the virus to resurrect a variety of mutants, including Cypher, Banshee, the original Hellions, Risque, Pyro, and Destiny.

When Bard returned to Proudstar's tribe's burial grounds to resurrect Caliban and Thunderbird, the spirits of the tribe rose to protect those buried there. Bard attacked them with Selene's mystical knife, transforming them into a Demon Bear. After fleeing the battle, Bard leaves the blade behind, unaware it was pivotal in Selene's plans. He is then dispatched to Utopia to retrieve it, taking Warpath hostage in the process. When he returns to Selene with the blade and the hostage, Selene kills him by stabbing him in the heart with the blade, reducing him to bones.

Baron Blood

John Falsworth

Victor Strange

Kenneth Crichton

Baron Brimstone

Baron Mordo

Baron Strucker

Baron Zemo

Heinrich Zemo

Helmut Zemo

Barracuda

Barrage

Turk Barrett

Breeze Barton

Base
Base (Hiro Sokuto) is a mutant who was born in Hiroshima, Japan, and his powers surfaced at an early age. His father sold him and his brother to the Yakuza to act as drug runners, but they were eventually captured by the Mutagenic Search Squad, and became a member of Genetix.

Basilisk
The Basilisk is the name of three fictional characters appearing in American comic books published by Marvel Comics.

The first is a supervillain who debuts in Marvel Team-Up #16 (December 1973). The second is a lizard-like villain who first appears in Morbius, the Living Vampire #5 (Jan. 1993). The third is a mutant who first appears in New X-Men #135 (December 2002). Basilisk is also the codename used by an alternate reality version of the X-Man Cyclops in the Age of X crossover.

Basil Elks

Basil Elks is a petty thief who breaks into a museum to steal what he believes is an ordinary emerald - but is in fact an alien Kree artifact called the Alpha Stone. Elks, however, miscalculates the security guards rounds and is caught and fired upon when he reaches for a weapon. The guard's bullet accidentally hits and shatters the gem, causing an explosion that transforms Elks into a humanoid reptilian - his skin becomes green and scaly and his eyes are now large and red. Elks then flash-freezes the guard in place, and realizing that he now has superhuman abilities, decides to become a supervillain and calls himself the Basilisk. He faced off against Spider-Man, Mister Fantastic, Captain Marvel and the Mole Man which ended with him being imprisoned in another Kree artifact called the Omega Stone that ended up in lava.

The Omega Stone he was imprisoned in was found in a lava river by some Moloids who worshiped it. After absorbing the Omega Stone into himself (thus increasing his power to its fullest potential) and breaking free, he fought the Thing and defeated him until Spider-Man arrived. After hearing the Basilisk's origin, Spider-Man manages to help the Thing regain consciousness and they fight the Basilisk. During the fight, the Basilisk disappeared during a cave-in.

The Sphinx pulled the Basilisk from his timeline and paired him up with Moonstone, Ulysses Bloodstone, the Man-Wolf and Gyre to compete against the Sphinx's elder self and his team consisting of Black Bolt, Darkhawk, Mister Fantastic, Namorita, and Nova.

The Basilisk reappeared in the crossover storyline involving the Scourge of the Underworld, a vigilante who assassinated numerous minor supervillains. Seeking retaliation against the Thing, the character tunneled his way to the headquarters of the Fantastic Four which was undergoing construction, but was murdered by the Scourge of the Underworld disguised as a construction worker.

Dead Ringer later acquired a tissue sample from the Basilisk's body and assumed his form.

During the "Dark Reign" storyline, the Basilisk was resurrected - along with 16 other criminals murdered by the Scourge - by master criminal the Hood using the power of the entity Dormammu. The revived characters form a squad to attempt to eliminate the Punisher; the Basilisk completed the mission by capturing the Punisher.

During the "Fear Itself" storyline, the Basilisk is among the villains that escape from the Raft after the Juggernaut takes the form of Kuurth: Breaker of Stone and damages the facility heavily. He assists the Man-Bull, the Griffin, and another escaped inmate in a bank robbery. When Hercules arrives, he recognizes that the fourth person with them is actually Hecate. The Basilisk joined the Man-Bull and the Griffin in fighting Hercules until Hecate regained her memories. When a revived Kyknos attacks Hercules, the Basilisk and the Man-Bull flee. Hercules and the Griffin manage to find where the Basilisk and the Man-Bull are hiding and recruit their help. The villains approach Hecate and Kyknos using a ruse involving Hercules being turned to stone. Hercules quickly revives and saves the villains by killing Kyknos, while Hecate escapes.

The Basilisk was later hired by HYDRA where he was paired up with the Looter to steal the Ellsworth Sonic Reducer. Both of them are defeated by the Superior Spider-Man (Doctor Octopus's mind in Spider-Man's body) and are webbed up for the police.

Wayne Gifford

Wayne Gifford is a dysfunctional person who turns to demon-worshipping to create an alternate persona, the Basilisk. Possessing a paralyzing stare, the Basilisk battles the anti-hero Morbius the Living Vampire.

Mike Columbus

Mike Columbus is a mutant and a student at the Xavier Institute. Possessing limited intelligence and persecuted in his youth due to his abnormal appearance (bald, abnormally large and with one eye), the character is extremely aggressive. Once the Basilisk's mutant power manifests, he suffers from brain seizures until given a device to help regulate the ability.

The Basilisk joins the Brotherhood of Mutants. They take over New York City. While watching human prisoners march by, he makes a joke about a perceived bad smell. The Brotherhood's leader Magneto attempts to deliver a punishment, but kills the Basilisk instead.

Powers and abilities
Upon absorbing the Alpha Stone, Basil Elks possessed enhanced physical strength, reflexes, and stamina. The Basilisk's main offensive weapon were his eye beams, which could be concussive force (these could also be directed at the ground for limited flight) or energy that manipulated temperature (to boiling or freezing extremes) or molecules. Upon absorbing the Omega Stone, Basilisk's powers increased to their full extent, allowing him to generate volcanoes worldwide, including in the Savage Land and New York City.

Wayne Gifford was a normal human until becoming the Basilisk, a large humanoid reptile. The creature possesses superhuman strength and agility, and a paralyzing stare. The Basilisk's one weakness is its reflection, which serves as a reminder of its former state.

Mike Columbus possesses an overly-fleshy head devoid of all features except for sunken ears, a slit-like mouth, and a single centered eye socket. A camera-like device is located in this socket that allows the Basilisk to control his superhuman mutant ability to emit a pulse of high-frequency strobe light from his brain. The light paralyzes any sentient being that views it, while the length of the effect varies depending upon the willpower of the onlooker.

Bast

Bastion

Batroc the Leaper

Battleaxe
Battleaxe (Anita Ehren) is a fictional character in the Marvel Comics Universe. She first appeared in The Thing #33 (March 1986), and was created by Michael Carlin and Ron Wilson.

An unlimited class wrestler, Battleaxe is a massive woman who carries an axe as her weapon of choice. Defeating Titania in a wrestling match, she claims the title as champion of the Grapplers. However, when Titania is slain by the Scourge of the Underworld, Battleaxe vows to avenge her former teammate. She takes out her aggression on the Thing, battling him in a wrestling match. Realizing Battleaxe is taking her anger out on him, the Thing purposely loses the match. She later joins Superia's Femizons and battles Captain America. She also fights BAD Girls, Inc. while in a costumed bar.

Later, in Ms. Marvel's own series, Battleaxe fights the titular heroine in front of William Wagner's closed restaurant. Puppet Master's mind-controlled Chilean soldiers catch Battleaxe and try to take her with them. Ms. Marvel defeats them and takes the soldiers and Battleaxe on her minicarrier.

Battleaxe has superhuman strength and durability. She carries a set of two axes which are her weapons of choice.

Battlestar

Batwing

Baymax

Beast

Beautiful Dreamer

Bedlam

Jesse Aaronson

Olisa Kabaki

Beef

Beetle

Abner Jenkins

Leila Davis

Joaquim Robichaux, Elizabeth Vaughn and Gary Quinn

Janice Lincoln

Hobgoblin's Beetle

Bela

Belasco

Bella Donna

Bengal

Dexter Bennett

Bereet

Berzerker

Beta Ray Bill

Beyonder

Bi-Beast

Big Bertha

Big Man

Frederick Foswell

Janice Foswell

Henry Pym Jr.

Big Wheel

Baxter Bigelow

Bird-Brain

Bird-Man

Henry Hawk

Achille DiBacco

Unnamed

Bishop

Derek Bishop
Derek Bishop is a fictional character appearing in American comic books published by Marvel Comics. The character, created by Allan Heinberg and Jim Cheung, first appeared in Young Avengers #2 (March 2005). He is a wealthy individual, and the father of Kate Bishop / Hawkeye and Susan Bishop. Unfortunately, Derek secretly conspired with supervillains (such as the Kingpin and Madame Masque) to put a hit on Kate and Clint Barton / Hawkeye.

Alternate versions of Derek Bishop
The Ultimate Marvel version of Derek Bishop is a sleeper agent for the terrorist group Hydra. He captures Miles Morales / Spider-Man while kidnapping Black Widow, Jefferson Davis and Ganke Lee. However, he is defeated by Spider-Man.

Derek Bishop in other media
Derek Bishop appears in the live-action Marvel Cinematic Universe (MCU) / Disney+ television series Hawkeye, portrayed by Brian d'Arcy James. In addition to being Kate Bishop's father, this version was in financial debt before he was killed off-screen during the Battle of New York.

Eleanor Bishop
Eleanor Bishop is a fictional character appearing in American comic books published by Marvel Comics. The character, created by Kelly Thompson and Leonardo Romero, first appeared in Hawkeye (vol. 5) #7 (June 2017). She is the mother of Kate Bishop and Susan Bishop. Although she was presumed deceased, Eleanor is revealed to be alive as a vampire while working as Madame Masque's silent partner.

Eleanor Bishop in other media
Eleanor Bishop appears in the live-action Marvel Cinematic Universe (MCU) / Disney+ series Hawkeye, portrayed by Vera Farmiga. In addition to being Kate Bishop's mother, this version is the CEO of Bishop Security and Jack Duquesne's fiancé. She also hired Yelena Belova to eliminate Clint Barton and keep her status as a silent partner to the Kingpin secret, but is eventually arrested for her actions.

Bison

Black Ant

Black Bolt

Black Box

Black Cat

Black Crow

Black Dwarf
Black Dwarf is a fictional supervillain appearing in American comic books published by Marvel Comics. He is a prominent member of the Black Order, a team of aliens who work for Thanos. Black Dwarf first appeared in a one panel cameo in New Avengers (vol. 3) #8 (September 2013) and was created by Jonathan Hickman and Jerome Opeña. His full appearance, along with a number of the other members of the Black Order, takes place in Infinity #1 (October 2013).

Black Dwarf is a member of Thanos' Black Order where he is the powerhouse of the Mad Titan's army.

When Thanos targeted Earth as the next planet he would raze during the Infinity, Black Dwarf arrived in Wakanda. To his surprise, Black Dwarf found great resistance in that country and was forced to retreat. For his failure, Thanos expelled Black Dwarf from the Black Order.

Thanos gave Black Dwarf one more chance to prove himself by sending him to protect The Peak and keep it from being reclaimed by the Avengers following their fight against the Builders. During the fight against the Avengers, Black Dwarf was killed by Ronan the Accuser.

During the "No Surrender" arc, Black Dwarf was resurrected by Challenger who reassembles the Black Order to go into a contest against Grandmaster's Lethal Legion.

Black Dwarf in other media
 Black Dwarf makes non-speaking appearances in Avengers Assemble, as a member of Thanos' Black Order.
 Black Dwarf appears in Guardians of the Galaxy, voiced by Jesse Burch.
 A variation of Black Dwarf, renamed Cull Obsidian, appears in media set in the Marvel Cinematic Universe, voiced and motion-captured by Terry Notary.
 Introduced in the live-action film Avengers: Infinity War, Thanos sends him and Ebony Maw to Earth to retrieve the Infinity Stones. While attempting to retrieve the Time Stone from Doctor Strange, Obsidian fights Iron Man and Spider-Man before Wong sends Obsidian to Antarctica, severing the alien's left arm in the process. After being picked up by Corvus Glaive and Proxima Midnight and receiving a cybernetic prosthetic off-screen, Obsidian joins them in attacking the Avengers in Wakanda to retrieve the Mind Stone. However, Bruce Banner uses Iron Man's Hulkbuster armor to send Obsidian flying into Wakanda's force-field, killing the alien.
 An alternate timeline version of Obsidian appears in the live-action film Avengers: Endgame. He joins Thanos in traveling through time to stop the Avengers from foiling Thanos' plans, only to be crushed by Scott Lang / Giant Man in the ensuing fight.
 Alternate timeline versions of Obsidian appear in the Disney+ animated series What If...?. In the episode "What If... T'Challa Became a Star-Lord?", a variant of Obsidian works for the Collector instead of Thanos, who reformed years prior. In the episode "What If... Zombies?!", another variant of Obsidian joins Maw in traveling to Earth to obtain the Time Stone, only to be killed and zombified by a zombified Iron Man, Doctor Strange, and Wong.
 Black Dwarf appears as a mini-boss and boss in Marvel Avengers Alliance.
 Black Dwarf, as Cull Obsidian, appears as a boss and unlockable playable character in Marvel Future Fight.
 Black Dwarf, as Cull Obsidian, appears as an unlockable playable character in Lego Marvel Super Heroes 2 via the "Marvel's Avengers: Infinity War Movie Level Pack" DLC.
 Black Dwarf, as Cull Obsidian, appears as a support character in Marvel Puzzle Quest.
 Black Dwarf, as Cull Obsidian, appears as an unlockable playable character and mini-boss in Marvel Contest of Champions.
 Black Dwarf, as Cull Obsidian, appears as a boss in Marvel Ultimate Alliance 3: The Black Order, voiced again by Jesse Burch.

Black Fox

Raul Chalmers

Black Fox is a fictional villain appearing in American comic books published by Marvel Comics. The character's primary appearances have been in Spider-Man titles.

Publication history
His first appearance was in The Amazing Spider-Man #255 (August 1984), and he was created by Tom DeFalco and Ron Frenz. The inspiration for the character comes from safari cards bought by Tom DeFalco. The character subsequently appears in The Amazing Spider-Man #265 (June 1985), #304 (September 1988), #348-350 (June–August 1991), Web of Spider-Man Annual #10 (1994), and The Irredeemable Ant-Man #7-12 (June–November 2007). The Black Fox received an entry in the Official Handbook of the Marvel Universe Update '89 #1 and in the Official of the Marvel Universe A-Z Update #1.

Fictional character biography
Black Fox is a jewel thief with a long international career. In his sixties, he yearns to pull off one last big heist so that he can retire for good to the French Riviera. However, his retirement plans continue to be deferred due to unfortunate encounters with super-beings. In each of his encounters the Fox, having no super-human powers of his own, is in way over his head. The thief's usual response when caught by a superhero is to surrender and negotiate release, which he accomplishes with fabricated stories about his poor wife and children or his poor deceased mother. However, in his last encounter with Spider-Man, the Fox was unable to pull the same trick and was carted off to jail.

In addition to coming into conflict with Spider-Man, Black Fox has been forced to lead the Red Ghost's super-apes on a robbery mission. He has also been pursued by Silver Sable and Doctor Doom, and had his fiancee murdered by the assassin Chance.

He was defeated by the Eric O'Grady incarnation of Ant-Man, who took the jewels Fox stole to a pawn shop and sold them himself. Black Fox, however, tracked down O'Grady and forced the Ant-Man to repay him for the botched heist. Ant-Man and Black Fox then returned to the pawn shop together and held up the place. Since then, Ant-Man and Black Fox have become partners in crime of sorts. Black Fox can often be seen at O'Grady's apartment playing on a Wii console.

Dr. Robert William Paine

"Black" Jack Tarr

Black Knight

Sir Percy

Nathan Garrett

Dane Whitman

Augustine du Lac

Unnamed Woman

Black Mamba

Black Marvel

Black Panther

T'Chaka

T'Challa

Shuri

Black Racer

Black Rider

Black Sky

Black Spectre

Black Swan

Mutant

Yabbat Ummon Turru

Black Talon

Pascal Horta

Desmond Drew

Samuel Barone

Black Tarantula

Black Tom Cassidy

Black Widow

Claire Voyant

Natalia Romanova / Natasha Romanoff

Yelena Belova

Monica Chang

Tania

Blackheart

Blacklash

Mark Scarlotti

Unnamed Man

Unnamed Woman

Blacklight

Blackout

Marcus Daniels

Half-demon

Blackwing

Joseph Manfredi

Heavy Mettle

Barnell Bohusk (Beak)

Blade

Donald Blake

Dr. Donald "Don" Blake is the fictional doctor identity of Marvel Comics character Thor. The character, created by Stan Lee and Jack Kirby, first appeared in Journey into Mystery #83 (August 1962).

Donald Blake is a construct of Odin, created for the purpose of giving a weak and powerless identity for Thor. After removing his memory, Thor started his life as the crippled Don who chose to be a doctor after sympathizing with the sick. Don finds the hammer Mjolnir and transforms into the God of Thunder. Later, Don regains his memory as Thor and soon learns the whole truth from Odin. The Blake identity has been used here and there before Odin opted to erase him from existence. After Thor was killed by the Serpent, Donald Blake suddenly came into existence as a separate entity fully aware that his whole life had been a lie. Under the alias of the Dragon, Blake conducted a deadly campaign against Odin, the former All-Father of Asgard, and targeted all those blessed by Odin's magic. After an epic battle, Blake is defeated, but demands that Odin kill him, declaring that he will never allow himself to be imprisoned again. While Odin is ready to carry out the deed, Loki and Thor work together to stop him, recognizing Blake as their brother and, like Loki, someone who has suffered from being brought into their dysfunctional family. Nevertheless, Blake caused a huge amount of suffering and remains dangerous, so Thor hands him over to Loki, who accepts the responsibility of dealing with the brother their father forgot. Blake is chained in a dungeon, with a venomous serpent forever hovering above him, dripping its poison into his eyes, the same punishment Loki has suffered in the past. Loki then officially renounced his title as the God of Lies, passing it to Blake.

Alternate versions
In the Ultimate Marvel Universe, Donald Blake is the human reincarnation of Balder.
A non-powered version of Blake appears as a resistance fighter in an alternate history line where the Nazis have won World War II.

Donald Blake in other media
 Donald Blake appears in "The Mighty Thor" segment of The Marvel Super Heroes, voiced by Chris Wiggins.
 Donald Blake appeared in the Spider-Man episode "Wrath of the Sub-Mariner", voiced by Jack Angel.
 Donald Blake appears in The Incredible Hulk, voiced by Mark L. Taylor.
 Donald Blake appears in The Incredible Hulk Returns, portrayed by Steve Levitt. In this version, rather than transform into Thor, Blake is a separate entity that can summon Thor by yelling out Odin's name while holding Thor's hammer.
 Donald Blake makes a brief cameo appearance in Doctor Strange: The Sorcerer Supreme.

Blank

Blastaar

Siena Blaze

Blazing Skull

Blindfold

Blindspot

Mutant

Samuel "Sam" Chung

Bling!

Blink

Bliss

Blitz
Blitz is a minor character in Marvel Comics.

Jamie Zimmerman was created by Terry Kavanagh and Alex Saviuk, and first appeared in Web of Spider-Man #99 (April 1993). A female member of the New Enforcers, she possessed super-human strength and agility as well as a heavily armored costume, and Spider-Man was initially unaware of her capabilities. Blitz was ultimately defeated by Spider-Man and Blood Rose.

Blitz in other media
A heavily adapted version of the character named Barkley Blitz appears in Spider-Man, voiced by Ogie Banks. The leader of a group of adrenaline junkies called the Wake Riders, this version is a fan of Adrian Toomes and initially uses the Vulture identity before later taking on the Goblin moniker. In the episode "Rise Above It All", Blitz manipulated Spider-Man to become involved in stunts while covering up the Wake Riders' heists. During a heist at Horizon High, Barkley and the Wake Riders were joined by the Vulture, but are defeated by Spider-Man and the Ultimate Spider-Man. However, Barkley and the Wake Riders are released from police custody when their publicist Gabby Flenkman fabricates a cover story that J. Jonah Jameson supports. In the four-part episode "Goblin War", Blitz joined the Goblin Nation as the Goblin King's personal enforcer, engaging in combat with Spider-Man and Harry Osborn before being defeated by Ghost-Spider.

Blitzkrieg

Blitzkrieg is a fictional character in the Marvel Universe. He was created by Mark Gruenwald, Bill Mantlo, Steven Grant, and John Romita, Jr., and first appeared in Marvel Super-Heroes: Contest of Champions #1 (June 1982).

Franz Mittelstaedt was born in Backnang, Germany. He was inspecting an electrical power plant when a stray bolt of lightning struck a faulty generator and bathed him in electricity. When he emerged from his coma weeks later, he found that he could summon lightning at will to wield as a weapon. He decided to use his powers in the name of democracy.

Later he was teleported away by the Grandmaster, along with hundreds of other heroes of Earth, so that the Grandmaster and Death could choose champions from among them. Blitzkrieg was chosen for the Grandmaster's team, fighting alongside fellow heroes Captain America, the aboriginal Talisman III, Darkstar, Captain Britain, Wolverine, Defensor, Sasquatch, Daredevil, Peregrine, She-Hulk, and the Thing. When the Grandmaster's team won the contest, the heroes were returned to Earth.

Blitzkrieg later joined the German superhero team Schutz Heiliggruppe, along with Hauptmann Deutschland and Zeitgeist. The team intended to arrest the Red Skull for his World War II war crimes, assaulting Arnim Zola's castle and fighting and defeating the Skeleton Crew.

Blitzkrieg later traveled to Buenos Aires to investigate the deaths of a number of South American superheroes, including his former ally Defensor. Blitzkrieg was confronted by his teammate Zeitgeist, who turned out to be the serial killer Everyman. Everyman killed Blitzkrieg, adding him to his long list of murdered superheroes, but Blitzkrieg was later avenged by Hauptmann Deutschland, now known as Vormund, who killed Everyman.

Blitzkrieg possessed the ability to summon lightning mentally, at up to 15,000,000 volts. He can manipulate all forms of electrical energy, using them to allow him to fly, create electrical energy shields and cages, and electrical tornadoes. He is also immune to electricity, and can sense electrical transmissions and track them to their source.

Blizzard

Gregor Shapanka

Donald Gill

Randy Macklin

Blob

Blockbuster

Michael Baer

Man-Brute
The Man-Brute first appeared in Captain America #121 (January 1970), and was created by Stan Lee and Gene Colan. The character subsequently appears as Blockbuster in Omega the Unknown #7 (March 1977), and #9 (July 1977), in which he is killed.

The man originally known as the Man-Brute was an ex-convict whose strength was boosted by a factor of twelve by Professor Silas X. Cragg. Cragg was an enemy of Captain America from the World War II era who had developed a variant of the Super Soldier Serum which he used to empower the Man-Brute. Cragg sent the Man-Brute to attack Captain America at a charity event, but when the Man-Brute ran into his own estranged son he became upset at what he had become. Man-Brute attacked Cragg, who backed into a high voltage machine and was electrocuted.

Renaming himself Blockbuster, he sought to acquire wealth for his son Robert, to give him a better life and keep him from becoming a criminal like himself. He robbed a bank, leading to conflict with the NYPD and then Omega the Unknown. Omega felt empathy for Blockbuster and his son, and let the man escape with the money. After Blockbuster robbed a diamond store, the owner offered a thousand dollar reward to which Omega responded. After struggling with Omega a few times, Blockbuster was incinerated by the second Foolkiller.

Blockbuster possessed superhuman strength, durability, endurance, etc. He was an experienced street fighter, although he did not demonstrate any advanced fighting skills.

Blonde Phantom

Blood Brothers

Bloodaxe

Bloodhawk

Bloodlust

Bloodscream

Bloodshed

Cullen Bloodstone

Elsa Bloodstone

Ulysses Bloodstone

Bloodstrike

Blood Spider
The Blood Spider (Michael Bingham) is a fictional supervillain appearing in American comic books published by Marvel Comics. He first appeared in The Amazing Spider-Man #367 (October 1992), created by writer David Michelinie and artist Jerry Bingham.

Blood Spider is a mercenary trained by Taskmaster under contract by the Red Skull to create a team of mercenaries who would be capable of defeating Spider-Man. The trio were patterned after the superheroes Captain America, Hawkeye and Spider-Man, and the characters were called Death-Shield, Jagged Bow and Blood Spider.

Solo joined the fray on the side of the wall-crawler and helps to defeat the three villains and thwart Red Skull's machinations who was using the mercenaries to guard private files sought by Spider-Man in reference to his parents.

Years later, Blood Spider appears with Death-Shield and Jagged Bow among the criminals vying for the multi-million dollar bounty that was placed on Agent Venom's head by Lord Ogre. The trio's attempt on Agent Venom's life is interrupted by competing mercenaries Constrictor and Lord Deathstrike.

Crime Master, with the help of Blood Spider, Death-Shield and Jagged Bow, later tries to steal a damaged Rigellian Recorder from Deadpool and the Mercs for Money.

Of the trio, Blood Spider was the only character who displayed any superhuman abilities. He was able to shatter a solid concrete wall with a very powerful move, indicating he possessed some degree of superhuman strength. He was not as powerful as Spider-Man, and not nearly as fast. He carried a back pack and wrist devices capable of shooting webbing similar to that of Spider-Man, but much weaker. An ordinary human in peak physical condition, such as Solo, was able to tear through it, which would not have been possible with Spider-Man's webbing. Blood Spider's costume has several design elements that Bagley would later incorporate into the redesign of Ben Reilly's Spider-Man costume. The most prominent of the traits is the use of a larger, symmetrical spider emblem on the front and back, the legs of which meet on the shoulders.

Blood Spider in other media
 A variation of Blood Spider appears in Ultimate Spider-Man, voiced by Benjamin Diskin. This version is an alternate universe counterpart of Peter Parker who hails from a universe where vampires led by the Lizard King have taken over most of Earth. In the episode "Return to the Spider-Verse" Pt. 1, Blood Spider teams up with the "prime" Spider-Man and Kid Arachnid to search for the Siege Perilous' shards and free humanity from the Lizard King's control. The Spider-Men proceed to cure all those infected and defeat the Lizard King, but Blood Spider is attacked by Wolf Spider who steals the shard the trio found. In the episode "Return to the Spider-Verse" Pt. 4, Wolf Spider captures Blood Spider and several of his multiversal doppelgangers to drain their essence, only to be defeated by the "prime" Spider-Man. After being rescued, Blood Spider and the other doppelgangers return to their respective universes.
 Blood Spider is a playable character in the mobile video game Spider-Man Unlimited.
 A variation of Blood Spider appears in Spider-Man: Hostile Takeover, a prequel novel to the 2018 video game Spider-Man. He is recruited off the streets to undergo experiments in a lab run by Norman Osborn, which exacerbate his preexisting mental health issues. Afterwards, Blood Spider comes to believe that he is the real Spider-Man and Peter Parker is an imposter. Under his own Spider-Man persona, the former shows no interest in protecting and saving lives, stating he is the true Spider-Man as he is willing to kill whereas Peter will not. This disregard for human life causes the public to turn against Spider-Man, though a large number of people believe they are two separate people due to subtle yet obvious differences in their appearance. Eventually, Peter is able to draw the imposter into a public confrontation and prove his innocence. Subsequently, Blood Spider is defeated and incarcerated.

Bloodwraith
Bloodwraith (Sean Dolan) is a fictional character in the Marvel Comics universe. He was created by Mark Gruenwald, Dann Thomas, Roy Thomas and Tony DeZuniga, and first appeared in Black Knight #2 (July 1990).

Bloodwraith is the murderous enemy of Black Knight and the Avengers. While Sean Dolan was known as Bloodwraith, Bloodwraith is made up of the souls of those the Ebony Blade has slain. He is an expert swordsman compelled to take lives, especially innocent lives. The blade is indestructible and able to cut through almost any material. The blade was forged from a meteorite and Merlin's magic. The blade can trap dead souls and absorb or deflect all kinds of energies and mystical power. Bloodwraith can sense the ebony blade and control it like a telekinetic. If separated, Bloodwraith can teleport to the Ebony Blade or teleport the blade to himself. Bloodwraith rides a winged horse named Valinor.

Sean Dolan was an amateur swordsman with no special abilities. When Sean drew the ebony blade, he found himself overwhelmed and controlled by all the souls of those the sword had slain, and became the Bloodwraith. The Bloodwraith was dark black in color and appeared in costume. The sword constantly craved new blood to add, and those it slew found their souls locked in an eternal battle of good vs. evil in a dimension inside the sword. Bloodwraith rides his winged horse, Valinor, and is an expert swordsman. He can control the ebony blade rather like a telekinetic. When separated from the blade, he can sense its presence and instantaneously teleport to its location. The ebony blade could slice through anything and, previously, would curse its wielder with petrification if its wielder used the blade to draw blood. When he wielded Proctor's sword, the Bloodwraith and Valinor appeared much more skeletal and could channel powerful blasts through the sword. When powered by the Slorenian souls, Bloodwraith became composed of an energy unknown to man, and both he and the sword grew to gigantic size.

Blue Blade
The Blue Blade (real name Roy Chambers) is a fictional character appearing in American comic books published by Marvel Comics. Created by an unknown writer and unknown artist, his only appearance was in USA Comics #5 (cover-dated Summer 1942), published by Marvel forerunner Timely Comics during the period known as the Golden Age of Comic Books.

After the 1940s the character disappeared into obscurity until 2007, when he reappeared in the limited series The Twelve. a Blue Blade is a very powerful weapon of the mystic oceans of the Baru Triangle

Blue Blaze
Blue Blaze (real name Spencer Keen) is a superhero granted enhanced strength, dense skin, increased endurance and an increased life span 
by a mysterious blue energy source, and appeared in Mystic Comics #1-4.

Blue Diamond

Blue Eagle

Blue Marvel

Blue Shield

Blue Streak/Bluestreak

Don Thomas

Jonathan Swift

Blue Kelso

Bob, Agent of HYDRA

Elias Bogan

Bolt

Ahura Boltagon
Ahura is a fictional character appearing in American comic books published by Marvel Comics. The character is usually depicted as a member of the Inhumans species. Ahura was created by Ann Nocenti and Bret Blevins and first makes an appearance in Marvel Graphic Novel: The Inhumans (1988). Ahura was created to be the son of Black Bolt and Medusa. After disappearing from publications for many years, Silent War reveals he was banished to a prison since he shared his uncle's, Maximus The Mad, mental instability, and all mention of him was forbidden. As a result of Maximus manipulating a war between the United States of America and the Inhumans, Ahura is freed. Maximus states Ahura had nothing wrong with him. The apparent madness was a telepathic illness Maximus had inflicted on him. During the Skrull infiltration, Ahura was abducted by the Skrulls to be used as emotional leverage against his father, Black Bolt. Ahura and Black Bolt were soon freed by their fellow Inhumans. On the Inhumans's return to Earth, Medusa allowed him to join the Future Foundation, but then Black Bolt allowed Ahura to be taken into the past by Kang the Conqueror. Black Bolt returns him and he becomes the new CEO of Ennilux Corporation. Ahura took a fleet of Ennilux zeppelins to help the Inhumans in their clash with the X-Men, and provided them with a device to destroy the Terrigen cloud. In an alternate timeline, Ahura becomes the new Kang.

Bomblast

Bombshell
Bombshell is the name of a fictional character appearing in Marvel comics. Wendy Conrad is a mercenary specializing in explosives hired to kill Hawkeye while in service of Crossfire before ultimately joining Misty Knight's group.

Other versions
A mother/daughter criminal team of Lori Baumgartner and Lana Baumgartner, who originally existed in the Ultimate Marvel Universe, worked together as the Bombshells.

Bombshell in other media
 A variation of Wendy Conrad appears in the live-action Marvel Cinematic Universe / Disney+ series Hawkeye (2021), portrayed by Adetinpo Thomas. This version is a LARPer nicknamed "Bombshell" by her wife who is recruited by Kate Bishop to assist her and Clint Barton in their fight against the Tracksuit Mafia.
 Lana Baumgartner / Bombshell appears as a playable character in the mobile game Spider-Man Unlimited.

Bonebreaker

Alexander Bont

Boom-Boom

Boomerang

Bor

Bor Burison is an Asgardian in the Marvel Universe. The character, created by Stan Lee and Jack Kirby and named for Borr from Norse mythology, first appeared in Journey into Mystery #97 (October 1963).

Bor, son of Buri, became the ruler of Asgard where under his rule he created the universe. He eventually married the giantess Bestla and had four sons with her named Cul, Vili, Ve and Odin. Out of all of his sons, Bor paid special attention to Odin, whom he groomed to become the next king. However, Bor was angered by Odin's decision to create humans which he was unable to reverse. Nevertheless, Bor strongly sided with Odin and the two went into battle against the Frost Giants. Bor went up against one giant, who was actually a time traveling Loki in disguise, and battled him, but was killed.

Loki would impersonate Bor's ghost to get Odin to defeat Laufey and adopt the boy that would become Loki. Loki resurrected Bor in modern day, but affected his mind making him think that monsters were everywhere. He encountered his grandson Thor and the two fought in a destructive battle that involved the Dark Avengers. Bor was killed by Thor who only found out about his identity afterwards by Loki and Balder. Hela later brings Bor back to life to lift Mjolnir. When he was unable to, Hela reduces him to dust. She then uses him to battle Thor once again.

Bor once again returns to halt the wedding between Asgardian Sigurd and Valkyrie Dísir, causing much ire with the two as well as Danielle Moonstar, Hela, and Loki.

Bor in other media
Bor appears in the 2013 live-action movie Thor: The Dark World, portrayed by Tony Curran. He appears in a flashback depicting the Asgardians' battle against the Dark Elf forces of Malekith the Accursed five thousand years ago.

Bova

Melissa Bowen

Melissa Bowen is the mother of Tandy Bowen (the superhero known as Dagger) in Marvel Comics. The character, created by Bill Mantlo and Rick Leonardi, first appeared in Cloak and Dagger #4 (January 1984). The character, a wealthy socialite, was depicted as being very emotionally distant from Tandy. When Tandy runs away, Melissa is irritated at her daughter due to the cost of hiring people to search for her.

Melissa Bowen in other media
Melissa Bowen appears in the Freeform series Cloak & Dagger, portrayed by Andrea Roth. After the car accident that killed Nathan Bowen on the night with the Roxxon Gulf Platform collapsed, Melissa struggled to make ends meet while dealing with the fact that Roxxon repossessed some of Nathan's stuff from her home upon her husband's death and posthumously firing with the help of her lawyer boyfriend Greg Pressfield. While she still loves her daughter, Melissa has since become an alcoholic and a drug pusher and has been working low paying jobs that she keeps getting fired from. Despite her many flaws, she does show genuine concern for her daughter. She further ends up in a relationship with her lawyer, but she breaks up with Greg. She immediately regrets this, but Greg is murdered by a female hitwoman posing as a water jug delivery person. Melissa and Tandy celebrate the anniversary of Nathan's death. Tandy and Tyrone later access Melissa's memory where it was shown that Nathan once slapped Melissa for spilling coffee on paperwork; this led to Tandy taking up Peter Scarborough's offer to pay to get Melissa out of the trailer park. The female hitperson that killed Greg confronts Melissa at her home working under Scarsborough's orders by the time Tandy visits her mother. The hitperson gives Tandy until the count of three to come out before she shoots Melissa. Thanks to a tactic by Tandy, her mother is saved from the hitwoman and left to confront Scarsborough. Following the Terrors crisis, Melissa is cleaning up her house as Tandy comes home showing her a newspaper stating that Roxxon was responsible for the incident. Tandy and Melissa have improved their relationship where they attend a women's support group. Tandy later finds alcohol, pills, and Chinese food on Melissa's counter where Tandy figures out that her mother has relapsed. Melissa is later seen among the women enthralled by Andre Deschaine. Melissa appears inside the Loa Dimension watching Andre's performance. After being hit by Tandy's light attack, she, Mikayla Bell, and Mina Hess hold Andre as Tyrone and Tandy finish Andre off. Melissa is later seen seeing Tandy off when her daughter leaves New Orleans.

Box

Roger Bochs

Madison Jeffries

Jamie Braddock

Isaiah Bradley

Brain Drain

Brainchild

Abigail Brand

Ellen Brandt

Ellen Brandt is a supporting character in Marvel Comics. The character, created by Roy Thomas, Gerry Conway and Gray Morrow, first appeared in Savage Tales #1 (May 1971). She is the love interest of Man-Thing.

Brandt grew up in a loveless, emotionless household which she had hoped to escape. She later meets Ted Sallis and the two ran away so they can elope. The two visited a fortune teller for fun who informed that tragedy would befall them. Sallis soon began working for S.H.I.E.L.D. and became lost in work, causing her to see Sallis as cold as her father. Brandt joined A.I.M. and plotted against her husband. When she revealed her true colors, she chased Sallis into a swamp where the latter uses an untested super-soldier formula, crashed into the swamp, and turned into Man-Thing. Brandt was frightened of her husband's appearance and abilities which burned half her face.

Ellen Brandt in other media
 A variation of Ellen Brandt appears in the live-action Marvel Cinematic Universe film Iron Man 3, portrayed by Stéphanie Szostak. This version is a war veteran who lost her arm in battle before A.I.M. founder Aldrich Killian injects her with the Extremis virus, which grants enhanced regenerative capabilities. Brandt and Eric Savin attack Tony Stark, but Stark is able to cause an explosion that sends her flying into a set of power lines, fatally electrocuting her.
 The Iron Man 3 iteration of Ellen Brandt appears as a playable character in the video game Lego Marvel's Avengers.

Betty Brant

G. W. Bridge

Brimstone Love

Britannia
Britannia is a member of the new UK marvel superhero team The Union. It has been released that Britannia is the leader of The Union, however Britannia's powers have not yet been released to the public.

Carl Brock

Carl Brock is a character in Marvel Comics. He was created by David Michelinie and Mark Bagley, and first appeared in The Amazing Spider-Man #375 (March 1993). He is Eddie Brock's father.

Carl was a businessman who lacked any form of emotion, until he met his love Jamie. They soon married and decided to have a family, but Jamie died when giving birth to their son Eddie. Carl would be cold and unloving towards Eddie, generally ignoring and only giving half-hearted compliments to his son. Eddie tried everything to gain his father's affection but it was never enough. Things only became worst after the teenaged Eddie got drunk and accidentally ran over a neighbor's young son while driving with friends to which Carl went near bankrupt when he used most of his money to cover the incident, causing his resentment towards his son to increase. Carl ultimately disowned Eddie after journalist was fired due to the Sin-Eater hoax. His son bonded with the Venom symbiote and turned into an anti-hero which wasn't enough to impress Carl as Peter Parker / Spider-Man tried to question Carl about Eddie but Carl refused to give any information.

Anne Weying had gotten mysteriously pregnant with Eddie's child, leaving their son Dylan Brock with Carl who raised the boy as his own. Despite providing Dylan with a degree of love, Carl was abusive and even injured his grandson. When Eddie returned to his father, Carl didn't attempt to help his son and ordered Dylan to go inside home as the Maker's agents recaptured Eddie. Eddie came back and again tried to seek amends with his father, but Carl angrily told Eddie to leave as he didn't consider Eddie as his son. Dylan thought that Eddie was an older brother and went to Eddie to know but Dylan sent Eddie to the hospital, however, Carl arrived and forced Dylan to get in the car. When Dylan tried to argue and saw Eddie as a great person, Carl was about to lash out, but Venom's humanoid form confronted Carl inside their minds and Venom left Carl in the desert all alone.

Other versions
The Ultimate Marvel version of the character is Edward Brock Sr., an expert in bio-engineering and father of Eddie Brock Jr. He was a close friend with Richard Parker, with the two working together on the Venom project under Bolivar Trask's employment. He along with Richard, Mary Parker and his wife died from the plane crash orchestrated by Trask to gain the project's full ownership. But unbeknownst to Bolivar, Brock had kept a portion of the organism hidden for his son to inherit.

In Marvel Mangaverse, the character is Shinji, May Parker's first husband and father of Venom. When the Shadow-Clan came to claim May's sister, they shot multiple poisonous arrows, killing Shinji but with his son surviving.

In Venom: Beyond, Carl attended his son's funeral from a distance after the latter went through with suicide. Carl had a depressed look on his face while Anne was the only one to attended in person.

Carl Brock in other media
Edward Brock Sr. appears in Ultimate Spider-Man, voiced by Terrence Stone. This version tested the Venom suit personally while on the plane that he lost control of, which led to his and Richard Parker's deaths.

Nicholas Bromwell

Broo

Broo is a fictional character from Marvel Comics. He is a mutant from the Brood extraterrestrial race, but unlike his feral brethren he is intelligent and compassionate. Broo was born in the lab on a S.W.O.R.D. orbital research station called Pandora's Box. He joined the X-Men as a student in Wolverine & the X-Men #1.

He has been the object of bullying because of his odd behavior; however he does not seem to understand teasing and even takes it as a compliment. He has developed a relationship with Idie, and was at the top in his class behind Quentin Quire.

Kid Omega, who wanted to prove himself to Broo, Idie and Kid Gladiator who told him they never heard of him, reasoned with Krakoa who then joined Wolverine's X-Men.

After discovering a robot placed there by the Hellfire Club to manipulate Oya, Kade Kilgore and Max Frankenstein tell Broo about their plans, but he is shot and left for dead before he can tell anyone else. Beast saves his life with assistance by Brand, Peter Parker, Reed Richards and Tony Stark. Broo was treated and put into a coma, and once he awoke, he had reverted to his feral brood instincts and acted like that of an animal. He spent some time as an unwilling student in Kade Killgore's Hellfire Academy mutant school. Idie comes with him for supervision, and Quentin Quire comes to rescue them both. Quire advances the theory that Idie has fallen in love with Broo pre-trauma.

Broo was often seen attacking fellow students and support staff at Killgore's school, random, brutal violence being fully supported and encouraged by the teachers. He was kidnapped by the genocidal alien Xanto Starblood, who was going to teach Broo the hard sciences and feed him unique beings. While on Xanto's ship, Broo bit a Bamf and was healed, restoring his self-aware, intelligent, and compassionate self, and the staff returned him to the school.

During the Battle of the Atom, Broo babysat Shogo Lee.

Broo later appears as a member of the Agents of Wakanda.

When Wolfsbane of the New Mutants comes into possession of a Brood King egg, Broo informs her of the object's significance, just as the Brood attack Krakoa en masse to retrieve it. Broo journeys into space along with the rest of the X-Men to lure the Brood away, and eventually ends up eating the egg's contents, making him a Brood King.

Broo is a Brood mutant because he can feel compassion and has high intelligence. Like the rest of the Brood, Broo has several powers, including enhanced strength, enhanced speed, enhanced agility, ability to breathe in space, and insect wings that allow him to fly. His increased intelligence has resulted in funding for his beloved school; Broo has developed a line of pastries that cause the consumer to lose weight.

Vanessa Brooks
Tara Vanessa Cross-Brooks is a character in Marvel Comics. Created by Marv Wolfman and Gene Colan, the character first appeared in Tomb of Dracula #13 (July 1973). She is the mother of Eric Brooks / Blade. Brooks was an heiress seeking sanctuary with Madame Vanity of the Order of Tyrana. During childbirth, Deacon Frost (posing as a doctor) killed her by drinking all of her blood while turning the boy into a part-vampire. Brooks is later resurrected as a vampire by Dracula to use against Blade but is destroyed.

Vanessa Brooks in other media
 A character inspired by Vanessa Brooks called Miriam the Vampire Queen appeared in the Spider-Man episode "The Vampire Queen", voiced by Nichelle Nichols. She is an ambitious vampire who incurs the wrath of Blade and Morbius. After draining people of plasma, she assembles the Neogenic Recombinator to turn everyone in New York into vampires. However, her plan is foiled by Blade, Morbius, Spider-Man, Black Cat, Terri Lee, and Abraham Whistler, though Miriam manages to escape.
 Vanessa Brooks appeared in the live-action New Line Cinema film Blade (1998), portrayed by Sanaa Lathan.
 Vanessa Brooks makes a non-speaking appearance in Marvel Anime: Blade.

Brother Tode

Brother Voodoo

Brothers Grimm

Jake and William Dolly

Percy and Barton Grimes

Bruiser

Brutacus

Brute

Bucky

James Buchanan Barnes

Fred Davis

Jack Monroe

Rick Jones

Lemar Hoskins

Rikki Barnes

Julia Winters

Paul Budiansky

Bug

Bulldozer

Henry Camp

Marci Camp

Bullet
Bullet (Buck Cashman) is a character in Marvel Comics. He first appeared in Daredevil #250 (January 1988), and was created by Ann Nocenti and John Romita Jr. A covert agent of the US government, he wears a facemask while acting as a mercenary. 

He participates in a scheme on the Kingpin's behalf. Bullet has the environmental protection organization "Save the Planet" bombed in a terrorist fashion then "arrested" the supposed saboteur who is released through legal maneuvering, and killed a man in toxic waste and framed the Save the Planet environmentalists. Matt Murdock/Daredevil confronted Bullet both times, and the two fought. Bullet realized that Daredevil was the man who fought him previously but does not know the costumed crimefighter's true identity. Bullet confessed to his crimes to the police but made a single phone call to which all charges against him are dropped and he's released. He is also the father of Lance Cashman who he supports despite of his activites and usually leave at his place alone, and has Lance frequently lie to alibi his father. 

Bullet joined criminals recruited by Typhoid Mary in an assault alongside Bushwacker, Ammo and the Wildboys that nearly killed Daredevil. Daredevil later decided to get revenge on Bullet, tracking Lance and helped against some bullies, earning Lance's trust. Lance managed to convince Daredevil to not fight his father, but Bullet misunderstood and believed Daredevil threatened Lance and the two fought before Lance stopped the fight. Bullet admitted actually liking Daredevil, attacking previously only because he had been hired to. Bullet is later hired for the Kingpin's interests to buy land that would rise in value with a highway's construction, intimidating constructor Mr. Zeng to not help Ben Urich to which Daredevil is asked to help and publicly fought Bullet who relinquished the fight. Bullet is also having contempt for Gloria, Lance's mother who rarely accepts responsibilities to stay with Lance. 

After his citizenship revoked due to his mercenary actions at some point, Bullet works with Shotgun while hired by Agent Joy Jones of the F.B.I. to track down Bullseye, nearly getting killed by a drug cartel yet surviving and getting arrested by S.H.I.E.L.D. and managing the silently view Lance doing well. However, Bullet is tortured by Bullseye for information on Vendetta and Shotgun; his son Lance is also abducted and murdered by Bullseye despite Old Man Logan's efforts.  

Bullet is hired alongside the Rhino, Crossbones, Stilt-Man and Bullseye by Quinn Stromwyn and Una Stromwyn to go on a rampage through Hell's Kitchen, but is defeated by Daredevil.

Recently, he acted as an unwilling host of the Phage symbiote. 

He survived and is imprisoned in the Myrmidon prison which he was broken out of by Daredevil to join the Fist alongside Speed Demon, Fancy Dan, Stilt-Man, Wrecker, Stegron and Agony. It's also revealed that his son is secretly still alive and that he had put his son into hiding.

Bullseye

Bulwark

Nathaniel Bumpo

Sonny Burch

Sonny Burch is a minor character in Marvel Comics. The character, created by writer John Jackson Miller and artist Jorge Lucas, first appeared in Iron Man (vol. 3) #73 (December 2003).

As chairman of Cross Technological Enterprises, he acquires Iron Man's technology patents to be sold to various companies to improve his own political position. However, Burch had neither the knowledge nor care to fully understand that even Iron Man's outdated technology is too sophisticated for adapting; examples of Burch's incompetence include a submarine where Iron Man and Captain America save the military personnel, a missile defense system for the U.S. Government, and Oscorp's imperfect battlesuits and military drones. Technological mistakes threaten a cargo plane carrying Iron Man's various armors (which were salvaged after blackmailing Carl Walker) to crash into Washington, D.C., resulting in Burch taking a gun and committing suicide. Fortunately, Iron Man saves the plane's personnel and guides it into a controlled crash-landing.

Sonny Burch in other media
A variation of Sonny Burch appears in the live-action Marvel Cinematic Universe film Ant-Man and the Wasp (2018), portrayed by Walton Goggins. This version is a black market criminal who trades and sells to big businesses and is the owner of a restaurant. He attempts to buy Hank Pym's quantum technology, but Hope van Dyne declines. Burch's men fight van Dyne and Scott Lang before the Ghost interrupts the fight. After interrogating Lang's friends for information on Lang's location, Burch and his men attempt to steal Pym's lab, only to be subdued by Lang's friends and arrested by federal agents led by Jimmy Woo.

Burglar

Burner

Noah Burstein
Noah Burstein is a fictional character appearing in American comic books published by Marvel Comics. The character, created by Archie Goodwin and George Tuska, first appeared in Hero for Hire #1 (June 1972).

Noah Burstein is a scientist who worked on recreating the super soldier serum that created Captain America, and in the process created Warhawk. Years later, Burstein would hire Luke Cage to capture Warhawk. He landed a job at Seagate Prison experimenting on inmates one of them being Carl Lucas. He left Lucas in an "Electro-Biochemical System" when racist guard, Billy Bob Rackham, came to sabotage the experiment only for it to increase Lucas' strength and durability.  He later gets a job at the Storefront Clinic with Claire Temple as his assistant. He reunites with Lucas, who had changed his name to Luke Cage, and asks him to rescue Claire when she is kidnapped by Willis Stryker who now went by Diamondback.

Burstein and Claire are later kidnapped by John McIver, who demanded that a similar treatment be done to him as was done to Luke Cage, becoming Bushmaster. He and Claire are later rescued by Cage. At one point Bushmaster returns to force Burstein to work for him even kidnapping his wife, Emma, as leverage. Both he and his wife are saved by Iron Fist this time. He would continue to be kidnapped by criminals only for Luke Cage and Iron Fist to come and rescue him.

Noah Burstein in other media
Noah Burstein was a recurring character in Luke Cage, portrayed by Michael Kostroff. He fulfills the same purpose as his comic book incarnation. After Luke Cage escapes from Seagate, Burstein goes into hiding, living in a farmhouse with all of the experimental equipment he was able to salvage. Claire takes Luke to see him after Diamondback shoots him with a Judas bullet. He removes the pieces of the bullets only to reveal that he plans on using the information gleaned from him to improve on his experiments. He even so far as to tell him that Reva Connors, who was his assistant at the time, was also in on the plans. Enraged by the deception, Luke destroys his equipment before he and Claire leave. However, Burstein is able to retrieve some of the information from his files. In the season 1 finale, Burstein is seen in Diamondback's hospital room following his defeat, though his intended plans for Diamondback are unknown.

Bushman

Bushmaster

Bushwacker

Butterball

Vivian Dolan's

Emery Schaub

Emery Schaub is a superhero in the Marvel Comics universe. The character, created by Christos N. Gage and Steve Uy, first appeared in Avengers: The Initiative #13 (2008).

An invulnerable overweight fry cook, Schaub is recruited to the Initiative program and given the codename Butterball. Despite Schaub's invulnerability, his lack of physical strength, skill, and wits make him an inappropriate candidate for the superhero program.

When Norman Osborn takes control of the Initiative, Schaub is part of Henry Peter Gyrich's Shadow Initiative assembled to retake control of Negative Zone Prison Alpha from the forces of Blastaar. In spite of heavy losses, the team completes their mission. Schaub has subsequently been referred to as a hero by Norman Osborn and used as an everyman figure for propaganda purposes by H.A.M.M.E.R., Osborn's military arm. During the Siege on Asgard, Butterball helps the Avengers Resistance. Later, Butterball is a founding member of a new superteam in North Carolina. He later joins the Avengers Academy.

Emery Schaub in other media
Butterball appears in Lego Marvel's Avengers, voiced by Patrick Seitz.

Butterfly

Buzz

Byrrah

References
  Text in this article was copied from Buck Cashman (Earth-616) at the Marvel Database, which is released under a Creative Commons Attribution-Share Alike 3.0 (Unported) (CC-BY-SA 3.0) license.

Marvel Comics characters: B, List of
Characters created by Ann Nocenti